Calder-Marshall is a surname. Notable people with the surname include:

 Anna Calder-Marshall (born 1947), English stage, film and television actress
 Arthur Calder-Marshall (1908–1992), English novelist, essayist, critic, memoirist, and biographer

Compound surnames
English-language surnames
Surnames of English origin